FC Dorostol is a Bulgarian football club based in Silistra, who currently plays at the North-East Third League, the third division of Bulgarian football. Its home stadium "Louis Ayer" has a capacity of 12 000 seats. Club colors are blue and white. The club was officially founded in 1945. However it exists informally from 1902, which makes it the oldest Bulgarian football club.

History 
The original founding year of Dorostol is considered to be the year 1902. The club was originally affiliated with the Bulgarian school in Silistra, whose students founded the sports society "Strela", meaning arrow in Bulgarian. Their first kit was black, which was also the color of the uniforms of the students from the school. From 1903 to 1909, the gymnastics teacher at the school was Louis Eyer, a Swiss gymnasist. In 1920, a Romanian team was founded in the area, called Dristor, later renamed Venus. This was, because at the time, Dobruja was part of Romania. After 1941, when Dobruja was given back to Bulgaria, the team is renamed to "Dorostol". 

In 1949, there is a major reorganization of sports activities and clubs in the country. New sports societies emerge in the city of Silistra, such as "Cherveno Zname", "Torpedo" and "Stroitel". There is a tournament held between the teams to be decided which one will play professional football. "Cherveno Zname" wins the tournament, and is promoted to the B PFG, the second tier of Bulgarian football. 

In 1958, there is another major reorganization of sports activities in the country, which unites all the teams from Silistra into one - "Dorostol". Club colors were decided to be blue and white. 

In 1984, Dorostol managed to achieve something very unexpected, by reaching the final of the Cup of the Soviet Army. However, Dorostol lost 4-0 to Levski Sofia in the final.

The club was reformed in 2014, starting from V AFG, because of financial problems. In 2019, the club was disqualified from the third league, due to not having the financial availability to compete.

League positions

External links 
 Official site

Dorostol 2003
Association football clubs established in 1945
Association football clubs disestablished in 2012
1945 establishments in Bulgaria
2012 disestablishments in Bulgaria
Silistra